Frederick Justin Vulliamy (1913 – October 20, 1968) was a chartered accountant and politician in British Columbia. He represented Burnaby-Willingdon in the Legislative Assembly of British Columbia from 1966 to 1968 as a New Democratic Party (NDP) member.

He was born in Winnipeg and came to Vancouver, British Columbia with his family five years later. Vulliamy worked for the Alaska Pine Company for three years as an accountant before setting up his own practice. He was elected provincial president of the NDP in 1962. He was a director and later president of the Kitsilano Ratepayers' Association. Vulliamy was an unsuccessful candidate in the provincial riding of Vancouver Centre in 1963. He moved to Burnaby after being elected to the assembly in 1966. Vulliamy died in office two years later.

References 

1913 births
1968 deaths
British Columbia New Democratic Party MLAs